A music centre (or center), also known as a music complex, is a type of integrated audio system for home use, used to play from a variety of media. The term is usually used for lower end or sub-high fidelity equipment. In American English, these systems are typically referred to as "compact stereos", "shelf stereos" or simply "stereos." The term itself has been in use since the 1970s, though in more recent times the terms mini, micro or mini hi-fi, or integrated hi-fi have been preferred. The distinguishing feature compared to high-end equipment is that there is usually only one main unit, with maybe a pair of detachable or separate loudspeakers, though some equipment also has these built into the main unit.

History

Integrated audio equipment has a long history, beginning with the integration of the record player and the wireless receiver. Such units were usually called radiograms or stereograms in British English and consoles in American English. Very often these were designed as items of household furniture, with a large wooden cabinet on legs. These units were originally monaural, and featured a single integrated loudspeaker in the main body of the cabinet. By the 1960s these units had become smaller, and had developed to include stereophonic reproduction. The necessity of having suitable separation of the speakers meant that the single cabinet designs evolved into three-box designs, and the main box could become much smaller. By the beginning of the 1970s systems were starting to be made of plastic and other materials rather than wood.

The 1970s saw the inclusion of a deck for playing compact cassettes as well as a record player and receiver, and the term music centre came into common use. The inclusion of a turntable capable of playing full-sized gramophone records tended to dictate the overall size of these units, which remained relatively large. The cassette deck was either a top-loading unit beside the turntable or a front-loading unit mounted on a deeper front panel. By the end of the decade, the first very small systems started to appear, which dropped the integrated record player in order to reduce the size of the other components significantly. Other innovations such as electronic control of the cassette transport mechanism (as opposed to direct mechanical operation) allowed further size reductions.

"Midi"-style systems (mimicking the appearance of a component-based system) were also popular during the 1980s. These typically included a record deck, tuner, dual cassette deck, amplifier and separate speakers. Some later midi systems also included a CD player in the main unit in addition to the turntable.

The compact disc first appeared in the early 1980s. Towards the end of the decade, rapidly falling prices saw the increasing integration of CD players into cheap all-in-one systems. As CD rapidly eclipsed vinyl in the early 1990s, the bulky record player (common in Midi systems) was increasingly left out altogether. This allowed the resulting bookshelf-sized "mini" systems to be far more compact, and the integrated hi-fi system came into its own. The smaller size of a CD player compared to a turntable also meant that this function could be reintegrated into the main unit of more portable systems without compromising their small size.

The music centre has always been rather looked down upon by the hi-fi enthusiast. In the early days the sound quality was far below what was possible using separate components. The main compromise is in the area of the loudspeakers, where small size is favoured over the ability to reproduce an extended low frequency response. Modern equipment has improved in this respect, and such systems are popular. There are still some compromises in terms of what components are used within the integrated unit, compared to what could be fitted in a set of separates, but the differences are smaller than they used to be. There are a few exceptions however and these music centres used parts and designs from their separate counterparts of the time, for example amplifier modules, cassette transports and turntable assemblies that were offered in standalone equipment were often fitted into an all in one enclosure to create a music centre with the same, or close to, quality and fidelity as the individual equipment.

The market for these systems is probably now larger than that for "true" hi-fi. Small units take up less space, and are more suitable in urban areas.

See also
Entertainment center
Shelf stereo - a home stereo system that is small enough to be placed on a shelf or similar location, 1980s onward
Boombox -  a portable suitcase-sized cassette player and AM/FM radio, mid 1970s to 1990s

Consumer electronics
Audio players